The North Central Conference was a college athletic conference that operated in the United States.

North Central Conference may also refer to:

 North Central Conference (IHSAA), an IHSAA-sanctioned athletic conference; Indiana
 North Central Conference (Iowa), an eight-team high school athletic conference
 North Central Conference (OHSAA), an OHSAA athletic league; Ohio
 North Central Community College Conference (N4C), of the  National Junior College Athletic Association; in Illinois and Wisconsin

See also

 
 North Conference (disambiguation)
 North Central (disambiguation)